The 2007–08 ECHL season was the 20th season of the ECHL.

Two teams suspended operations at the end of the 2006–07 season, the Long Beach Ice Dogs and the Toledo Storm. Toledo's suspension was granted after Toledo Arena Sports, Inc. acquired the Storm and requested a suspension of the team for two years in order to allow a new arena to be built in downtown Toledo to open in 2009 in time for the team to return to play.

The league officially welcomed back the Mississippi Sea Wolves, who had to suspend operations for two seasons (2005–07) because of damage to the Mississippi Coast Coliseum caused by Hurricane Katrina. The Elmira Jackals also joined the ECHL after being in the United Hockey League for their previous existence.
Another established team, the Trenton, New Jersey franchise, entered its ninth season with a new name.  The team, now owned by the NHL New Jersey Devils, adopted the Devils nickname.

Before the start of the season, the league announced that it would hand out a new award to honor on-ice referees for their dedication and contribution to the league, through the Ryan Birmingham Memorial Award.  The award is given in honor of Ryan Birmingham, a former ECHL referee who died in an automobile accident, while driving from Chattanooga, Tennessee to Snellville, Georgia in May 2007.  Birmingham died at the age of 24.

The Cincinnati Cyclones finished first overall in the regular season, winning the Brabham Cup, and became the third team in ECHL history to win the Brabham Cup and Kelly Cup in the same year by defeating the Las Vegas Wranglers four games to two.

League realignment
The ECHL announced the alignment of the 25 teams of the ECHL.

American Conference

North Division
Cincinnati Cyclones
Dayton Bombers
Elmira Jackals
Johnstown Chiefs
Reading Royals
Trenton Devils
Wheeling Nailers

South Division
Augusta Lynx
Charlotte Checkers
Columbia Inferno
Florida Everblades
Gwinnett Gladiators
Mississippi Sea Wolves
Pensacola Ice Pilots
South Carolina Stingrays
Texas Wildcatters

National Conference

Pacific Division
Bakersfield Condors
Fresno Falcons
Las Vegas Wranglers
Stockton Thunder

West Division
Alaska Aces
Idaho Steelheads
Phoenix RoadRunners
Utah Grizzlies
Victoria Salmon Kings

Playoff format

The ECHL realigned the playoff format for the two conferences.

National Conference
The top eight teams will advance to the playoffs, with the two division champions being the first and second seeds. 
The other six teams will be seeded by points.
Teams will not be re-seeded. 
All games are best of seven games.

American Conference
In the North Division, the top five teams will advance to the playoffs, with the division champion being the first seed. 
The other teams will be seeded by points.
The fourth seed and the fifth seed will play a best-of-three series in the Division Quarterfinals.
The winner will advance to the best-of-seven Division Semifinals
to meet the division leader. 
The second seed and the third seed will play a best-of-seven Division Semifinals.
The winners will advance to the best-of-seven Division Finals.
The winner will advance to the American Conference Finals.

In the South Division, the top eight teams will advance to the playoffs, with the division champion being the first seed.
The other teams will be seeded by points. 
Teams will be re-seeded according to the same criteria
with division leader seeded first and remaining teams seeded in order of regular-season points. 
All games are best of five games.
The winner of the Division Finals will advance to the American Conference Finals.

In the best-of-seven American Conference Finals
the North Division Winner will face the South Division Winner

Kelly Cup finals

The Kelly Cup finals will be a best-of-seven series between the two conference champions.

Regular season

Final standings
Note: GP = Games played; W = Wins; L= Losses; OTL = Overtime losses; SOL = Shootout losses; GF = Goals for; GA = Goals against; Pts = Points; Green shade = Clinched playoff spot; Blue shade = Clinched division; (z) = Clinched home-ice advantage
 
American Conference

National Conference

Final league standings

Scoring leaders

Note: GP = Games played; G = Goals; A = Assists; Pts = Points; PIM = Penalty minutes

Data referenced from ECHL website

Leading goaltenders

Note: GP = Games played; TOI = Time on ice (minutes); W = Wins; L = Losses; OTL = Overtime losses; SOL = Shootout losses; GA = Goals against; SO = Shutouts; SV% = Save percentage; GAA = Goals against average

Data referenced from ECHL website

Kelly Cup playoffs

No. is short for North Division
So. is short for South Division
Na. is short for National Conference
Playoff tables referenced from ECHL website

First round 
*if necessary
Times listed are local.

American Conference

(No. 4) Johnstown Chiefs vs. (No. 5) Dayton Bombers

(So. 1) Texas Wildcatters vs. (So. 8) Mississippi Sea Wolves

(So. 2) South Carolina Stingrays vs. (So. 7) Augusta Lynx

(So. 3) Gwinnett Gladiators vs. (So. 6) Charlotte Checkers

(So. 4) Florida Everblades vs. (So. 5) Columbia Inferno

Conference quarterfinals

American Conference

(No. 1) Cincinnati Cyclones vs. (No. 4) Johnstown Chiefs

(No. 2) Elmira Jackals vs. (No.3) Reading Royals

(So. 1) Texas Wildcatters vs. (So. 5) Columbia Inferno

(So. 2) South Carolina Stingrays vs. (So. 3) Gwinnett Gladiators

National Conference

(1) Las Vegas Wranglers vs. (8) Stockton Thunder

(2) Victoria Salmon Kings vs. (7) Bakersfield Condors

(3) Fresno Falcons vs. (6) Utah Grizzlies

(4) Idaho Steelheads vs. (5) Alaska Aces

Conference semifinals

American Conference

(No. 1) Cincinnati Cyclones vs. (No. 3) Reading Royals

(So. 2) South Carolina Stingrays vs. (So. 5) Columbia Inferno

National Conference

(1) Las Vegas Wranglers vs. (5) Alaska Aces

(2) Victoria Salmon Kings vs. (6) Utah Grizzlies

Conference finals

American Conference

(No. 1) Cincinnati Cyclones vs. (So. 2) South Carolina Stingrays

National Conference

(1) Las Vegas Wranglers vs. (6) Utah Grizzlies

2008 Kelly Cup finals

(No.1) Cincinnati Cyclones vs. (Na.1) Las Vegas Wranglers

ECHL awards

References

See also 
 ECHL
 Kelly Cup
 2007 in ice hockey
 2008 in ice hockey

 
ECHL seasons
3
3